Bolyartsi refers to the following places in Bulgaria:

 Bolyartsi, Kardzhali Province
 Bolyartsi, Varna Province